The 1991–1992 season was the 113th season in Bolton Wanderers F.C.'s existence, and their fourth successive season in the Football League Third Division. It covers the period from 1 July 1991 to 30 June 1992.

Results

Football League Division Three

F.A. Cup

Rumbelows Cup

Associate Members Cup

Top scorers

References

Bolton Wanderers
Bolton Wanderers F.C. seasons